Nick Richards may refer to:
 Nick Richards (singer-songwriter)
 Nick Richards (basketball)